is a Prefectural Natural Park in Western Tokyo, Japan. Established in 1950, the park takes its names from the Tama Hills, celebrated in the Man'yōshū. There are views towards the Chichibu Tama Kai National Park.

See also
 National Parks of Japan
 Parks and gardens in Tokyo

References

Parks and gardens in Tokyo
Protected areas established in 1950
1950 establishments in Japan